Dmitriy Donskoy (TK-208) is a decommissioned Russian Navy nuclear ballistic missile submarine, designated Project 941 Akula class (NATO reporting name Typhoon).

History

Construction
Hull number TK-208 was the lead vessel of the Soviet third generation Project 941 Akula class (NATO reporting name Typhoon) of ballistic missile submarines. She was laid down at the Sevmash shipyard, Tsekh No. 55, in Severodvinsk on 30 June 1976 and launched in September 1980.

1990–2020
In 1990, she entered the dry dock in Severodvinsk for upgrades and repairs. Due to both economic and technological problems, the completion was severely postponed. In 2000, work on the submarine was intensified.

In June 2002, now serving in the Russian Navy, TK-208 finally left the Severodvinsk dry dock. After 12 years of overhaul and modifications, she had now received the name Dmitriy Donskoy, named after the Grand Duke of Moscow Dmitry Donskoy (1359–1389), the reputed founder of Moscow.

The first launch of a Bulava missile was carried out by Dmitriy Donskoy on 27 September 2005. The vessel was surfaced and fired the missile from a point in the White Sea. On 21 December 2005, the new missile system was tested underwater for the first time. It successfully hit a target on the Kura Test Range on the Kamchatka Peninsula.

In August 2009, Patriarch Kirill visited the submarine and met the crewmen.

On 9 December 2009, Dmitriy Donskoy launched a Bulava missile. The third stage of the missile failed, and it was visible in Norway making a glowing spiral in the sky.

On 7 October 2010, the submarine launched another Bulava ballistic missile from the White Sea. Targets at the Kura Test Range in the Russian Far East were successfully hit. The submarine was reported active as of 2020 and had been upgraded to carry the RSM-56 Bulava submarine-launched ballistic missile. However, the scope of that upgrade was unclear.

Decommissioning
In 2021 it was reported that the submarine would remain in service until at least 2026. However, its role was also reportedly limited to that of a weapons test platform.

In 2021, a new Dmitriy Donskoy, now of the Borei-class, began construction.

On 20 July 2022, it was reported that Dmitriy Donskoy had been decommissioned. However, other sources suggested that no decision on her decommissioning would be made before the end of the year. In December 2022, she was being prepared for decommissioning with only technical staff remaining on the submarine. Her last reported activity was taking part in sea trials of SSN Krasnoyarsk in September 2022. On 6 February 2023, it was reported she was decommissioned.

References

 Northern Fleet section of the Bellona Foundation's website

Typhoon-class submarines
Ships built in the Soviet Union
1980 ships
Cold War submarines of the Soviet Union
Submarines of Russia
Ships of the Russian Northern Fleet
Ships built by Sevmash